Marvast (also known as Marvas and Dabestān-e Khvājeh Marvast) is a city in the Central District of Marvast County, Yazd province, Iran, and serves as capital of the county. At the 2006 census, its population was 7,585 in 1,966 households, when it was a city in Marvast District of Khatam County. The following census in 2011 counted 8,865 people in 2,437 households. The latest census in 2016 showed a population of 9,379 people in 2,790 households. Khatam District was raised to the status of a county after the census, with the city of Marvast as its capital.

History 

Herat and Marvast are small towns, with grain, canvas and fruit, with temperate climate and running water, and Marvast is a large Diyat and has the same characteristics. (Nezhat Al-Qaloub, Hamdollah Mostofi)

Sheikh Mushar al-Aly had several specific properties. First, he was constantly in prison to grieve the heart of the dervish. The other was that you loved to make someone important and to get rid of confinement. Another was that it was necessary for the subordinates to take care of themselves, the other because Jahanshah Mirza Pir Bagh extracted from Shiraz and he found in Baghdad Abu Yusuf Miza installed in his place in Shiraz and five thousand tomans in Shiraz in the form of {unread} He said. Buwanat, Herat and Marvast are annexed to Kerman province of Shiraz. (Diar Baker, Abu Bakr Tehrani)

From the block between Shiraz and Yazd, the northern boundary of the pomegranate is east of Babak, south of Herat and west of Fars province. Its center is the Marvast Caspian, with 4 villages and an area of 8 mins and a population of 3. From the middle of north Fars block and east of Shiraz its length from Taj Abad to Sahaf field is 14 Farsokh and its width from two farther east and north is limited to Babak Kerman block and from Maghreb to Bavanat block and from south to Nairiz block. The blockhouse is also called Marvst. Pars Province is five yards. Every court has read of the monastery which its institution had begun in its beginning, that is to say, the furnace of furnace, the furnace of al-Bjerd, and the towns of this furnace (furnace of furnace). Bowen is a town with a jumble and pulpit and a river with fruit and canvas. As its trees are like a bush, it is close to Kerman and its climate is temperate, with running water and prosperity. Herat village center - Marvast, Shahr Babak district, Yazd city, located in the northwest of Shahr Babak, near the Shawaz Yazd road to Marvast, with 2 tons of water from the aqueduct and its cereal crop. (Political Geography of the Universe)

Asadullah Fazel Mazandarani writes: "Marvast was a large block in the Fars province on the Kerman border, bounded on the west by Bavanat and on the south by Niriz and its center is the village of Marvast. This was an important village in Malek especially Mirza Mahmoud Afnan. Seven people were reported in the village of Marvast in year 9."

And for obvious reasons in the past and the existence of written documents and historical books, Marvast is a vast land with very valuable and authentic archaeological remains, a large cemetery and monuments found in Hamedan and Fakhrabad castles and other areas of Marvast, Marvast has been a part of the Fars block since the early Qajar period and was annexed to Jahanshah Qaraqviunlu in the year AH Marwast and then joined Yazd province for a number of years. It is from these two regions that people nowadays have a close connection This section is adjacent to the neighboring area of the province of Bavat Fars and daily people of these areas to do banking, health and shopping and to the city of Marvast and people came to these areas to use natural and recreational resources dependence and many connections It has been well established in these areas and the people of the city of Marvast, and since the work of most people in the city of Marvast is agricultural and the catchment of the Marvast dams is promoted by this region and especially in the cultural, dialectic, daily necessities and intervals. Communication shortcuts all indicate that Marous With a long history and authentic culture and with excellent capacities and resources, as well as the regional situation and cultural, social, natural, political and other resources that have been comprehensively and fully described below, the competence needed for development and promotion, further development.

Historic and natural attractions

Marvast is located 2 kilometers from the center of the province and has districts of Herarbanjan and Isar.

Tourist Attractions

Marvast has four historical valuable textures, including Marvast Cultural Historical Texture, Turquoise Historical and Cultural Texture, and each historical and cultural context of approximately 5 hectares.

There are also two villages of tourist destination, including Karokhanan and Chenarnaz, in the Marvast area, which is about 2 km from Marvast, and the historic village of Mobarkeh is located 2 km from the Marvast town and the beautiful white salt lake is 2 km away.

The villages of Karokhan and Chenarnaz are located in the pleasant mountainous areas of the region, which has a great beauty for domestic and foreign tourists. It is worth noting that there are monuments of historical value in the city including Marvast Historical Castle, Marvast Branch Caravan, Sheikh Abdullah Marvast Monument, Mobarka Castle, Studoon Karkhangan and the beautiful historic gardens in Marvast and the villages of Turkan and Herbarjan as well as numerous towers and towers. Barrow and Bath are other tourist attractions and potentials of the city that we will continue to introduce. The women's hilltop (Water Mountain), water mill, Merwast Garden, Salt Lake are other attractions of this area.

Marvast Castle

The fortress of Mervast dates back to pre-Islam. The castle is built of clay and masonry materials and the use of brick in the head is over the tall and overlooking the city of Marvast. The castle has three circular towers in three corners. Instead of a tower on the southwest side of the castle, head to the castle entrance. The head of the castle is built on two floors, the roof of the first floor is completely collapsed and only its bases are left. The highlight of the building and its aristocracy to the city and its attractions and views from far away and on entering Marvast are one of the hallmarks of this building. Agricultural products of this region include wheat, barley, maize, grapes, pistachios and pomegranates. This city is the most important agricultural center of Yazd province and one of the main areas of grape production in Iran.

Geography

Mountainous area
This area is at the bottom of the Zagros Mountains, the highest mountain in the province after the Lion Mountain in the Nice Chenar area called Dehar. There are also caves such as the House of God Cave, Lee Dark, Baba Zahid, Korah Springs and 2500-year-old Karakhan Karangan and Alley of gardens in Chenarnaz village in Isar Marvast village is one of the tourist attractions of the region.
2- Plain and Desert: Rhubarb Plain and the flowers of Arsalan and Salt Lake, as well as the delhi hills (sandy hills) in the eastern part of Marvast, which is about 5 times the height of Mount Rig Mehriz, is one of the most beautiful and unique attractions of Marvast.

Forests
Cute sycamore forests, shrubs covered with wild pistachio trees, Kikum is one of the most beautiful goddesses in this land that exhibits the creator of being.

Culture
The culture of the Marvast area is influenced by the culture of Kerman, Fars and Yazd and the local dialect is a combination of these two regions which, due to the communication and travel of the people of Marvast to these areas for the use of natural and recreational resources and the neighboring areas of Marvast for banking purposes. And the purchase of dependency and excellent connections to these areas and the people of the city of Marvast has been established, as well as the employment of most of the people in the city of Marvast, and the upgrading of the Marvast dams is an area that has enhanced this connection, especially in the cultural sector, daily necessities and short distance communication. It was mentioned earlier that the name of Mervast in the historical texts was due to the existence of many castles and the great amount of monuments that indicate its extent and prosperity in the past has been known as Darwalkalat, which so far has more than 3 historical monuments in the city of Mervast. The national monuments have been registered. In spite of the many cultural and historical monuments recorded in the Marvast area, there are many nature resorts in the nature of the area, which annually witness the presence of many guests, compatriots and citizens. Among the natural and remarkable recreational areas are the over 2,000 year-old deer, forests with a variety of forest plants, shrubs, Arsalan flowers, a white lake and a salt lake.

References 

Cities in Yazd Province

Populated places in Yazd Province